Polyptychus girardi is a moth of the  family Sphingidae. It is found from Guinea east to Cameroon.

References

Polyptychus
Moths described in 1993